In molecular biology, TP53 target 1 (non-protein coding), also known as TP53TG1 is a long non-coding RNA. Its expression is induced by p53 under conditions of cellular stress.

See also
 Long noncoding RNA

References

Non-coding RNA